Reed Browning (born 1938, New York City) is an American retired professor of history.

Browning gained his B.A. from Dartmouth College, and his M.A. and Ph.D. from Yale University. He also studied at the University of Vienna. He taught at Amherst College from 1964 to 1967 and then spent forty years as an academic at Kenyon College, from which he retired in 2007.

Whilst at Kenyon College he served as provost and briefly as acting president. Recognition of his teaching excellence include the Senior Trustee Teaching Excellence Award (2001) and the Senior Cup (1981).

He has written books on British and European history, including The Duke of Newcastle (1975), Political and Constitutional Ideas of the Court Whigs (1982), and The War of the Austrian Succession (1994). A baseball fan, he has also penned  two sports history books: Cy Young: A Baseball Life (2000) and Baseball’s Greatest Season:  1924 (2003).

His peer-reviewed journal articles include: "The Duke of Newcastle and the Imperial Election Plan 1749-1754", published in Journal of British Studies, Volume 7 (1967), pp. 28–47; and "New Views on the Silesian Wars", published in Journal of Military History, Volume 69, Number 2, April 2005, pp. 521–534.

References

External links
Reed Browning's Faculty Page, Kenyon College

1938 births
Dartmouth College alumni
Writers from New York City
Yale University alumni
Living people
21st-century American historians
21st-century American male writers
Historians of the United Kingdom
American military historians
Historians from New York (state)
American male non-fiction writers